Girish Dattatray Mahajan is a politician from Jalgaon district of Maharashtra. He is current MLA of Jamner. He is currently Cabinet Minister for Medical Education, Rural Development & Panchayat Raj Department, Sports and Youth Welfare and was minister of water resources, Medical education and  minister for irrigation of Maharashtra state in Fadnavis's cabinet . Girish Mahajan is a member of the 14th Maharashtra Legislative Assembly for the Jamner (Vidhan Sabha constituency), serving his sixth consecutive term.

Early life
Mahajan was born in Jamner into a Marathi Mali family.

Career
As a college student, Mahajan was an active member of ABVP in 1978. In the ABVP, he started as a grassroots worker where he painted walls and distributed promotional posters for politicians. He was appointed Taluka President of ABVP.

Mahajan's political career commenced in earnest in the early eighties, when he became Taluka President of the Bharatiya Janata Yuva Morcha (youth wing of the BJP) in Maharashtra.

In 1992, Mahajan was elected as a Gram-Panchayat election for  Jamner. In 1995 he was elected to the Maharashtra state assembly for the first time. He served his 5th term as MLA as of 2014. Mahajan was sworn in as the Water Resources Minister of Maharashtra on 31 October 2014. His government won a confidence motion by oral vote on 12 November 2014 allowing it to continue to govern.

Positions held

Ministerial

Legislative

Within BJP

President, BJYM Jamner Taluka (1988-1990).
Vice President, BJP Maharashtra (1993-1995).
District Chairman, BJP, Jalgaon (2006).
Party Pratod. BJP Legislature Party, Maharashtra State (2008).
Region Vice President, BJP, Maharashtra Pradesh (2011).

See also
 Girish Mahjan Website
 Jamner
 Jamner Railway Station
 Jamner Vidhansabha Constituency

References

https://cmo.maharashtra.gov.in/en/governor-and-cabinet-ministers

6.https://cmo.maharashtra.gov.in/en/governor-and-cabinet-ministers

Maharashtra MLAs 1999–2004
Maharashtra MLAs 2004–2009
Maharashtra MLAs 2009–2014
Maharashtra MLAs 2014–2019
Maharashtra MLAs 2019–2024
People from Jalgaon district
Marathi politicians
1960 births
Living people
Maharashtra MLAs 1995–1999
Bharatiya Janata Party politicians from Maharashtra